Anokhi Ada is a 1973 Indian Hindi-language film produced and directed by Kundan Kumar. The film stars Jeetendra, Rekha and Vinod Khanna, with music composed by Laxmikant–Pyarelal.

Plot 
Two business partners, Lalaji and Gupta, are also very close friends and expect their friendship to turn into a relationship when their children, Rakesh and Neeta respectively get married. Things appear to be going according to plan, but change abruptly when a young man named Gopal is rescued from drowning and brought into the Lalaji household to recuperate. Gopal does recuperate and in order to repay his gratitude he offers to be employed by Lalaji in their business. Then Rakesh is killed by falling off a cliff; Gopal assumes control of the business; Lalaji and Gupta's friendship breaks up; he woos Neeta; and brings a look-alike of Rakesh – a hoodlum named Kishan – who is out for only one thing – that is to take over the wealth of the two businessmen – by hook or by crook.

Cast 
Jeetendra as Rakesh / Kishan
Rekha as Neeta Gupta
Vinod Khanna as Gopal
Padma Khanna as Radhika
Mehmood as Dr. Captain Bhushan
Jeevan as Khushiram
Nazir Hussain as Lalaji
Manmohan Krishna as Mr. Gupta
Praveen Paul as Mrs. Kamla Gupta
Kanhaiyalal as Ram Prasad "Ramu"
Manmohan as Shambhu
Brahmachari as Sewakram (Dr. Bhushan's Compounder)
Sanjana as  Rosy (Gopal's Girlfriend)
Keshav Rana as Govind
M. B. Shetty as Birju

Soundtrack 
Lyricist: Majrooh Sultanpuri

References

External links 
 

1970s Hindi-language films
1973 films
Films scored by Laxmikant–Pyarelal